Mainzer is a surname. Notable people with the surname include:

Amy Mainzer (born 1974), American astronomer
Ferdinand Mainzer (1871–1943), German-Jewish gynaecologist and historical author
Klaus Mainzer (born 1947), German scholar and philosopher
Klaus Mainzer (rugby union) (born 1979), German international rugby union player
Otto Mainzer (1903–1995), German-American writer

See also

Maizeray
Maizerets
Maizeroy
Maizery
Manzur
Minzier
Munzer
Münzer